Trachypepla photinella is a moth of the family Oecophoridae first described by Edward Meyrick in 1883. It is endemic to New Zealand and has been collected in Wellington, Wainuiomata, D'Urville Island and Christchurch. The preferred habitat of this species is native forest and adults are on the wing from December until February.

Taxonomy
This species was first described by Edward Meyrick in 1883 using a specimen collected in the Wellington Botanic Garden in January and named Eulechria photinella. In 1918 Meyrick placed this species in the genus Trachypepla. This placement was followed by George Hudson when he discussed and illustrated this species in his book The butterflies and moths of New Zealand. The male holotype specimen is held at the Natural History Museum, London.

Description

Meyrick described this species as follows:

Distribution

T. photinella is endemic to New Zealand. As well as the type locality this species has been documented as having been collected in Wainuiomata, at D'Urville Island and in Christchurch.

Habitat
The preferred habitat of this species is native forest.

Behaviour 
Adults of this species are on the wing from December to February.

References 

Moths described in 1883
Oecophoridae
Taxa named by Edward Meyrick
Moths of New Zealand
Endemic fauna of New Zealand
Endemic moths of New Zealand